Lennox School District 41-4 is a school district headquartered in Lennox, South Dakota. In addition to Lennox it includes Chancellor and Worthing.

Schools
 LWC JH & Lennox HS - Lennox
 Lennox Elementary School/LWC Intermediate School - Lennox
 Worthing Elementary School - Worthing

References

External links
 
School districts in South Dakota
Education in Lincoln County, South Dakota
Turner County, South Dakota